Ottweiler is a municipality, former seat of the district of Neunkirchen, in Saarland, Germany. It is situated on the river Blies, approx. 7 km north of Neunkirchen, and 25 km northeast of Saarbrücken.

Culture
The town is notable for the Ottweiler porcelain.

The Ottweiler Brewing Company was founded in Ottweiler in 1873. It was moved to the Karlsberg Brewery in Homburg in 1983.

People 
 Ludwig Steeg (1894-1945), politician, mayor from Berlin from 1940-1945

References

External links
 Official website
 Saarländische Schulmuseum in Ottweiler

Neunkirchen (German district)